Alicto is a surname. Notable people with the surname include:

Cora Alicto (born 1980), Guam sprinter
Michael Alicto (born 1982), Guam sprinter

See also
 Alicot